This is a list of foreign ministers of Grenada.

1979–1981: Maurice Bishop
1981–1983: Unison Whiteman
1983–1984: Patrick Emmanuel
1984–1990: Ben Jones
1990............ Nicholas Brathwaite
1990–1991: Ben Jones
1991–1992: Nicholas Brathwaite
1992............ Denis Noel
1992–1995: Nicholas Brathwaite
1995............ Denis Noel
1995–1997: Keith Mitchell
1997–1998: Raphael Fletcher
1998–1999: R. Mark Isaac
1999............ Keith Mitchell
1999–2000: R. Mark Isaac
2000–2008: Elvin Nimrod
2008–2010: Peter David
2010–2012: Karl Hood
2012–2013: Tillman Thomas
2013–2014: Nickolas Steele
2014–2016: Clarice Modeste-Curwen
2016–2018: Elvin Nimrod
2018–2020: Peter David
2020–2022: Oliver Joseph
2022–present: Joseph Andall

Sources
Rulers.org – Foreign ministers E–K

Foreign
Foreign Ministers
Politicians